Shayne Robert Topp (born September 14, 1991) is an American actor and comedian most known for his work on Smosh.  He is also known for his roles as Shayne Zabo on Disney Channel's So Random!, and as Matt Bradley in ABC's The Goldbergs. He has been a member of Smosh since 2015, making his debut as the first referee of the Smosh Summer Games.

Early life
Shayne was born on September 14, 1991, in Florida, to Catherine Topp (née Person) and Robert Royal Topp, a fighter pilot. His grandfather, Wayne Topp, was also a fighter pilot.

As a military family, they moved a lot. Topp stated in the 55th episode of Smosh's podcast, SmoshCast, that, mostly, he was raised in Arizona, but also grew up in such states as Florida, Virginia, and California.

When Topp was 18 months old, he drowned in a swimming pool in his backyard and was clinically dead. According to him, his mother heard someone say his name when she ran to find him. He was revived on site.

Topp participated in an acting class with his friend (and fellow Smosh member) Noah Grossman, taught by the mother of Laura Marano.

Career
Topp also has experience in theater performances, starring in The Best Christmas Pageant Ever at Wonderworks Theatre Co. and Willy Wonka and the Chocolate Factory at Highland Lakes Theatre (in the title role). Additionally, he has appeared in commercials.

He went on to win the Jury Prize at the 2009 Los Angeles Film Festival for his performance in Dear Lemon Lima. In 2012, he and his now fellow Smosh member Damien Haas acted in the Disney Channel show So Random!. He was also nominated for "Exciting New Face (Male)" at the 2014 Young Hollywood Awards. Originally deciding to move away in 2015 due to a lack of work, he was convinced by fellow Smosh member Noah Grossman to audition for the cast of Smosh, for which he has remained a part of since 2015. Smosh’s parent company, Defy Media, went bankrupt in late 2018; however, Topp and the rest of the cast still continued to make videos, and in early 2019 it was announced that Smosh had been purchased by Mythical Entertainment.

Since 2017, Topp has played recurring character Matt Bradley, a best friend of main character Barry Goldberg (Troy Gentile) on ABC's The Goldbergs.

In 2019, Topp graduated from Arizona State University's online campus with a Bachelor of Arts in Psychology, a degree that he'd been pursuing since 2009. A surprise dedication and mock graduation ceremony was held by the Smosh crew and was uploaded to Smosh Pit in December 2019.

Filmography

Film

Television

Web

Awards and nominations

|-
| 2009
| rowspan=3|Dear Lemon Lima
| Los Angeles Film Festival (Jury Prize) - Outstanding Performance
|  
|-
| 2010
| Method Fest - Best Ensemble Cast
| 
|-
| 2014
| Young Hollywood Awards - New Exciting Face (Male)
|  
|}

References

External links
 

1991 births
21st-century American male actors
Arizona State University alumni
Living people